Paulo José Ramos Mendes (born 26 May 1966), known as Paulinho, is a Portuguese football manager and a former player of Angolan descent. He is the manager of B-SAD.

He played 12 seasons and 296 games in the Primeira Liga for Estrela da Amadora, Salgueiros, Estoril, Nacional and Benfica.

Club career
He made his Primeira Liga debut for S.L. Benfica on 26 August 1989 in a game against Vitória de Guimarães. He also played one game for Benfica in the 1989–90 European Cup against Derry City.

International
He played his only game for the Portugal national football team on 12 February 1992 in a friendly game against Netherlands.

References

External links
 
 

1966 births
Footballers from Luanda
Portuguese sportspeople of Angolan descent
Angolan emigrants to Portugal
Living people
Portuguese footballers
G.D. Estoril Praia players
S.L. Benfica footballers
Primeira Liga players
Portugal under-21 international footballers
C.D. Nacional players
Portugal international footballers
C.F. Estrela da Amadora players
S.C. Salgueiros players
Portuguese football managers
C.D. Pinhalnovense managers
Portuguese expatriate football managers
Expatriate football managers in China
Association football defenders